Loudon-Melrose is a Roanoke, Virginia neighborhood located in west Roanoke south of U.S. 460 (Melrose Avenue). It borders the neighborhoods of Shenandoah West on the west, Harrison and Gilmer on the east, Melrose-Rugby on the north and Hurt Park on the south opposite the Norfolk Southern rail yard.

History 
With the continued outward expansion of Roanoke resulting from the completion of the Salem-Melrose streetcar line in the 1890s, by the 1920s this outward residential expansion reached the Loudon-Melrose area. The residential design of the neighborhood is dominated by the two-story foursquare, constructed during the 1920s-1930s.

References

External links
 Loudon-Melrose/Shenandoah West Neighborhood Plan
 Loudon-Melrose Neighborhood Organization

Neighborhoods in Roanoke, Virginia